The 2013 Zuiderduin Masters was a BDO/WDF darts tournament that took place in Egmond aan Zee, Netherlands.

James Wilson won the tournament for the first time, beating defending champion and number one seed Stephen Bunting in the final.

Qualifying 
The players in bold are the seeded players for the group stages. The players in italics qualified through more than one method.

Men

Women

Results

Men's tournament

Group stage
All matches best of 9 legs. Two points are gained for every match won.
P = Played; W = Won; L = Lost; LF = Legs for; LA = Legs against; +/− = Leg difference; Pts = Points

Group A

Martin Adams 83.18 5–2 Jim Widmayer 79.57

Stephen Bunting (1) 91.71 5–1 Jim Widmayer 78.31

Stephen Bunting (1) 105.40 5–4 Martin Adams 96.47

Group B

Martin Atkins 91.22 5–3 Remco van Eijden 88.16

Benito van de Pas (8) 91.83 5–2 Remco van Eijden 72.68

Benito van de Pas (8) 79.71 5–3 Martin Atkins 81.72

Group C

Michel van der Horst 88.42 5–2 Scott Waites 81.67

Scott Waites 88.34 5–1 Richie George (5) 79.12

Michel van der Horst 88.89 5–4 Richie George (5) 84.82

Group D

Jan Dekker 80.59 5–3 Scott Mitchell 85.33

Wesley Harms (4) 89.94 5–1 Scott Mitchell 78.40

Wesley Harms (4) 82.86 5–2 Jan Dekker 81.56

Group E

Ross Montgomery 82.40 5–2 Yordi Meeuwisse 74.40

Yordi Meeuwisse 94.81 5–4 Robbie Green (3) 89.09

Ross Montgomery 86.93 5–3 Robbie Green (3) 88.27

Group F

Gary Robson 83.79 5–1 Jeffrey de Zwaan 77.44

Alan Norris (6) 90.82 5–2 Jeffrey de Zwaan 85.92

Gary Robson 80.24 5–3 Alan Norris 82.86

Group G

Danny Noppert 92.42 5–4 Darryl Fitton 94.21

Tony O'Shea (7) 93.69 5–1 Darryl Fitton 89.28

Tony O'Shea (7) 90.78 5–3 Danny Noppert 90.45

Group H

James Wilson 102.09 5–2 Rick Hofstra 94.56

Geert De Vos (2) 90.18 5–2 Rick Hofstra 80.49

James Wilson 95.86 5–2 Geert De Vos 92.94

Knockout stages

Women's tournament

Group stage
All matches best of 7 legs. Two points are gained for every match won.
P = Played; W = Won; L = Lost; LF = Legs for; LA = Legs against; +/− = Leg difference; Pts = Points

Group A

Group B

Final
Best of 3 sets.

 (1) Aileen de Graaf (74.34) 2–0  (2) Anastasia Dobromyslova (73.74)

References

External links
2013 Men's tournament Darts Database.
2013 Women's tournament Darts Database.

Finder Darts Masters
Zuiderduin Masters
2013 in Dutch sport